This Rather Than That is an album by American jazz vibraphonist and pianist Buddy Montgomery recorded in 1969 for the Impulse! label.

Reception
The Allmusic review awarded the album 3 stars.

Track listing
All compositions by Buddy Montgomery except as indicated
 "This Rather Than That" - 3:53   
 "Tin Tin Deo" (Chano Pozo) - 5:30   
 "Rose Bud" - 5:48   
 "Stormy" (Buddy Buie, J. R. Cobb) - 5:35   
 "Willy Nilly Blues" - 6:35   
 "Beautiful Love" (Egbert Van Alstyne, Haven Gillespie, Victor Young, Wayne King) - 5:22   
 "Didn't We" (Jimmy Webb) - 3:12   
 "Winding Up" - 4:20  
Recorded at Universal Recorders in Chicago, Illinois on September 10 & 11, 1969

Personnel
Buddy Montgomery - vibraphone, piano
Jodie Christian - piano (tracks 4 & 5)
Melvin Rhyne - organ (tracks 1, 2, 6 & 8)
Manty Ellis - guitar (tracks 4 & 5)
Jimmy Rowser - bass (tracks 3 & 4)
Monk Montgomery - Fender bass (tracks 1, 2, 5, 6 & 8)
George Brown - drums

References

Impulse! Records albums
Buddy Montgomery albums
1970 albums